Horace Henry Powers (May 29, 1835 – December 8, 1913) was an American lawyer, judge and politician. He was most notable for his service as an Associate Justice of the Vermont Supreme Court and a U.S. Representative from Vermont (1891-1901).

A native of Morristown, Vermont , Powers received bachelor's (1855) and master's (1858) degrees from the University of Vermont, studied law, and became an attorney in first in Hyde Park before later returning to Morristown. Powers became active in politics as a Republican, and served in the Vermont House of Representatives (1858-1859), as  State's Attorney of Lamoille County, Vermont (1861-1862), and the Vermont Senate (1872-1874). Powers returned to the Vermont House in 1874 and was elected to serve as Speaker of the House, but he resigned in order to accept appointment as an associate justice of the Vermont Supreme Court, where he served from 1874 to 1890.

In 1890, Powers was elected to the United States House of Representatives. He was reelected four times and served from March 4, 1891 to March 3, 1901. During his final three terms, Powers was chairman of the Committee on Pacific Railroads. He was an unsuccessful candidate for renomination in 1900, and resumed practicing law in Morristown.

Powers died in Morristown on December 8, 1913. He was buried at Pleasant View Cemetery in Morristown.

Early life
Powers was born in Morristown, Vermont to Dr. Horace Powers and Love E. Gilman Powers. He graduated from People's Academy, and received a bachelor's degree from the University of Vermont in 1855, where he was initiated into Delta Psi. He earned his master's degree from UVM in 1858. Powers studied law, was admitted to the bar in 1858, and practiced first in Hyde Park, and later in Morristown.

Start of career
He served as a member of the Vermont House of Representatives in 1858. Powers was the Lamoille County State's Attorney in 1861 and 1862.  He served as a member of the council of censors in 1869, and was a member of the State constitutional convention in 1870.

Powers served in the Vermont State Senate in 1872 and 1873.  In 1874, he was again a member of the Vermont House and served as Speaker.

Powers served as an associate justice of the Vermont Supreme Court from December 1874 to December 1890. He was a trustee of the University of Vermont from 1883 until his death in 1913.

He was a member of the Lamoille County Bank board of directors from 1888 until his death.

U.S. Congressman
Powers was elected as a Republican to the Fifty-second United States Congress and to the four succeeding Congresses, serving from March 4, 1891 until March 3, 1901. He served as chairman of the Committee on Pacific Railroads from the Fifty-fourth through Fifty-sixth Congresses. Powers was a delegate to the 1892 Republican National Convention.

In 1896, Powers sponsored a controversial bill that would have allowed the Central Pacific Railroad to obtain a 75-year delay paying off a 30-year-old debt to the government. The bill inspired a campaign of opposition led by publisher William Randolph Hearst and his employees, journalists Ambrose Bierce and Frank Norris.  In one article about the Powers Bill, Bierce memorably wrote that while the handsome Powers might not be qualified to serve as chairman of the Pacific Railroads committee, he was certainly qualified to head the "Committee on Visible Virtues."  In January, 1897 the Powers Bill was defeated 168 to 102.

Powers was an unsuccessful candidate for renomination in 1900. After leaving Congress, he resumed the practice of law in Morrisville, Vermont, and was chief counsel for the Rutland Railroad.

Personal life
Powers married Caroline Waterman on October 11, 1858. They had two children, Carrie L. Powers and George M. Powers. George M. Powers also served as the prosecuting attorney of Lamoille County, Vermont, and an associate justice of the Vermont Supreme Court. George Powers was the husband of Gertrude Francis Woodbury, whose father was Governor Urban A. Woodbury.

Death and legacy
Powers died in Morristown on December 8, 1913. He was interred at Pleasant View Cemetery in Morristown.

The Powers home in Morrisville is listed on the National Register of Historic Places by the United States Department of the Interior. The home was built around 1850 and is named the Horace Henry Powers House.

References

Further reading
 "Lamb's biographical dictionary of the United States, Volume 6" by John Howard Brown, published by James H. Lamb Company, 1903.

External links
 
 Biographical Directory of the United States Congress:POWERS, Horace Henry, (1835–1913)
 
 The Political Graveyard: Powers, Horace Henry (1835–1913)
 Govtrack.us: Rep. Horace Powers
 History50States.com: Horace Henry Powers Biography

1835 births
1913 deaths
People from Hyde Park, Vermont
University of Vermont alumni
Vermont lawyers
State's attorneys in Vermont
Justices of the Vermont Supreme Court
Republican Party Vermont state senators
Republican Party members of the Vermont House of Representatives
Speakers of the Vermont House of Representatives
Burials in Vermont
Republican Party members of the United States House of Representatives from Vermont
19th-century American politicians
19th-century American lawyers
20th-century American lawyers
19th-century American judges